The 1988 UEFA European Under-16 Championship was the sixth edition of UEFA's European Under-16 Football Championship. Spain hosted the championship, during 11–21 May 1988. 16 teams entered the competition, and Spain won their second title.

Qualifying

Participants

Results

First stage

Group A

Group B

Group C

Group D

Semi-finals

Third place match

Final

References

RSSSF.com
UEFA.com

 
1988
1987–88 in European football
1988
Euro
May 1988 sports events in Europe
1988 in youth association football